Staré Smrkovice is a municipality and village in Jičín District in the Hradec Králové Region of the Czech Republic. It has about 200 inhabitants.

Notable people
Vlasta Prachatická (1929–2022), sculptor

References

Villages in Jičín District